Whitehorn is a residential neighbourhood in the northeast quadrant of Calgary, Alberta.  It is bounded by McKnight Boulevard to the north, 52 Street NE to the east, 32 Avenue NE to the south and 36 Street NE to the west.  The Peter Lougheed Centre is located southwest from the neighbourhood. 

The area was annexed by the City of Calgary in 1961 and the community was established in 1973. It is represented in the Calgary City Council by the Ward 10 councillor.

The community is served by the Whitehorn station of the C-Train LRT system. The postal code in this area is T1Y.

Whitehorn also has a number of public schools in the area, including Annie Gale Junior High School and J. Fred Scott School for K-6.

Demographics 

Residents in this community had a median household income of $55,715 in 2000, and there were 19.5% low income residents living in the neighbourhood. As of 2000, 38% of the residents were immigrants, most of Vietnamese and East Indian origin. Most buildings were single-family detached homes and semi-detached, and 23.1% of the housing was used for renting.

Education 
The community is served by Annie Gale Junior High, Chief Justice Milvain Elementary and Colonel J. Fred Scott Elementary public schools, as well as St. Wilfrid Elementary (Catholic).

See also 
 List of neighbourhoods in Calgary

References

External links 
  Whitehorn Community Association

Neighbourhoods in Calgary